Cameraria agrifoliella is a moth of the family Gracillariidae. It is known from California, United States, and British Columbia, Canada.

The wingspan is 7.5–9 mm.

The larvae feed on Chrysolepis chrysophylla, Quercus agrifolia and Quercus virginiana. They mine the leaves of their host plant. The mine is found on the upperside of the leaf. It has an irregular shape, either circular or ovoid. The epidermis is opaque greenish yellow and often found across a midrib. The pupa is formed under a flat nearly circular semi-transparent web, the upper epidermis is thrown into a longitudinal fold.

References

External links
mothphotographersgroup

Cameraria (moth)

Moths of North America
Taxa named by Annette Frances Braun
Moths described in 1908
Leaf miners
Lepidoptera of the United States